In the practice of religion, a cult image is a human-made object that is venerated or worshipped for the deity, spirit or daemon that it embodies or represents. In several traditions, including the ancient religions of Egypt, Greece and Rome, and modern Hinduism, cult images in a temple may undergo a daily routine of being washed, dressed, and having food left for them. Processions outside the temple on special feast days are often a feature. Religious images cover a wider range of all types of images made with a religious purpose, subject, or connection. In many contexts "cult image" specifically means the most important image in a temple, kept in an inner space, as opposed to what may be many other images decorating the temple.

The term idol is an image or representation of a god used as an object of worship, while idolatry is the worship of a "idol" as though it were God.

Ancient Near East and Egypt

The use of images in the Ancient Near East seems typically to have been similar to that of the ancient Egyptian religion, about which we are the best-informed. Temples housed a cult image, and there were large numbers of other images.  The ancient Hebrew religion was or became an exception, rejecting cult images despite developing monotheism; the connection between this and the Atenism that Akhenaten tried to impose on Egypt has been much discussed. In the art of Amarna, Aten is represented only as the sun-disk, with rays emanating from it, sometimes ending in hands.

Cult images were a common presence in ancient Egypt, and still are in modern-day Kemetism.  The term is often confined to the relatively small images, typically in gold, that lived in the naos in the inner sanctuary of Egyptian temples dedicated to that god (except when taken on ceremonial outings, say to visit their spouse).  These images usually showed the god in their sacred barque or boat; none of them survive.  Only the priests were allowed access to the inner sanctuary.

There was also a huge range of smaller images, many kept in the homes of ordinary people.  The very large stone images around the exteriors of temples were usually representations of the pharaoh as himself or "as" a deity, and many other images gave deities the features of the current royal family.

Classical Greece and Rome

Ancient Greek temples and Roman temples normally contained a cult image in the cella. The cella in Greek temples was in the center, while it was located in the back of Roman temples. Access to the cella varied, but apart from the priests, at the least some of the general worshippers could access the cella some of the time, though sacrifices to the deity were normally made on altars outside in the temple precinct (temenos in Greek).  Some cult images were easy to see, and were major tourist attractions.  The image normally took the form of a statue of the deity, typically roughly life-size, but in some cases many times life-size, in marble or bronze, or in the specially prestigious form of a Chryselephantine statue using ivory plaques for the visible parts of the body and gold for the clothes, around a wooden framework. Most cult statues are anthropromorphic and take human shape. The most famous Greek cult images were of this type, including the Statue of Zeus at Olympia, and Phidias's Athena Parthenos in the Parthenon in Athens, both colossal statues now completely lost. Fragments of two chryselephantine statues from Delphi have been excavated.

The acrolith was another composite form, this time a cost-saving one with a wooden body.  A xoanon was a primitive and symbolic wooden image, perhaps comparable to the Hindu lingam; many of these were retained and revered for their antiquity.  Many of the Greek statues well-known from Roman marble copies were originally temple cult images, which in some cases, such as the Apollo Barberini, can be credibly identified.  A very few actual originals survive, for example the bronze Piraeus Athena (2.35 metres high, including a helmet).

In Greek and Roman mythology, a "palladium" was an image of great antiquity on which the safety of a city was said to depend, especially the wooden one that Odysseus and Diomedes stole from the citadel of Troy and which was later taken to Rome by Aeneas. (The Roman story was related in Virgil's Aeneid and other works.)

Abrahamic religions

Some members of Abrahamic religions identify cult images as idols and their worship or veneration as idolatry; the worship of hollow forms, though others do not. The matter has long been very controversial, depending largely on the degree of veneration or worship which is thought by opponents to be given to them. Plato and the Platonists employed the Greek word  to signify perfect immutable "forms".

The Book of Isaiah gave classic expression to the paradox inherent in the worship of cult images:

Judaism

Judaism emphatically forbids idolatry, and considers it one of the gravest sins.

Judaism is aniconic, meaning any physical depiction of God whatsoever is disallowed; this likewise applies to cult images. The prohibition of idols within Judaism is so severe that numerous stipulations exist which are beyond simply concerning their use: Jews cannot eat anything offered to an idol as a libation, cannot move openly in places where idols are present, and cannot interact with idol worshippers within certain timeframes of idolatrous festivals or gatherings.

As time progressed and the religious traditions which the Jews were exposed to diversified, what was considered "idolatry" was subject to some debate. In the Mishnah and Talmud, idolatry is defined as worshipping a graven image through the actions of both typical idol worshippers, and through actions customarily reserved for worship of the Jewish God in the Temple in Jerusalem, such as prostrating, sacrificing animals, offering incense, or sprinkling animal blood on altars. Kissing, embracing, or "honoring" an idol, while not considered idolatry per se, was still forbidden.

Christianity

Christian images that are venerated are called icons. Christians who venerate icons make an emphatic distinction between "veneration" and "worship".

The introduction of venerable images in Christianity was highly controversial for centuries, and in Eastern Orthodoxy the controversy lingered until it re-erupted in the Byzantine Iconoclasm of the 8th and 9th centuries. Religious monumental sculpture remained foreign to Orthodoxy. In the West, resistance to idolatry delayed the introduction of sculpted images for centuries until the time of Charlemagne, whose placing of a life-size crucifix in the Palatine Chapel, Aachen was probably a decisive moment, leading to the widespread use of monumental reliefs on churches, and later large statues.

The , an eighth-century work composed at the command of Charlemagne in response to the Second Council of Nicaea, set out what remains the Catholic position on the veneration of images, giving them a similar but slightly less significant place than in Eastern Orthodoxy.

The 16th-century Reformation engendered spates of destruction of images, especially in England, Scotland, Ireland, Germany, Switzerland, the Low Countries (the ), and France. Destruction of three-dimensional images was normally near-total, especially images of the Virgin Mary and saints, and the iconoclasts ("image-breakers") also smashed representations of holy figures in stained glass windows and other imagery. Further destruction of icons, anathema to Puritans, occurred during the English Civil War. Less extreme transitions occurred throughout northern Europe in which formerly Catholic churches became Protestant.

Catholic regions of Europe, especially artistic centres like Rome and Antwerp, responded to Reformation iconoclasm with a Counter-Reformation renewal of venerable imagery, though banning some of the more fanciful medieval iconographies.  Veneration of the Virgin Mary flourished, in practice and in imagery, and new shrines, such as in Rome's , were built for Medieval miraculous icons as part of this trend.

According to the Catechism of the Catholic Church:

Islam

Towards the end of the pre-Islamic era in the Arabian city of Mecca, an era otherwise known by the Muslims as جاهلية, or al-Jahiliyah, the pagan or pre-Islamic merchants of Mecca controlled the sacred Kaaba, thereby regulating control over it and, in turn, over the city itself. The local tribes of the Arabian peninsula came to this centre of commerce to place their idols in the Kaaba, in the process being charged tithes. This helped the Meccan merchants to incur substantial wealth, as well as ensuring a fruitful atmosphere for trade and intertribal relations in relative peace.

Muhammad's preaching incurred the wrath of the pagan merchants, causing them to revolt against him. The opposition to his teachings grew so volatile that Muhammad and his followers were forced to flee Mecca to Medina for protection, leading to armed conflict and triggering many battles that were won and lost, which finally culminated in the conquest of Mecca in the year 630. In the aftermath, Muhammad did three things. Firstly, with his companions he visited the Kaaba and literally threw out the idols and destroyed them, thus removing the signs of Jahiliyyah from the Kaaba. Secondly, he ordered the construction of a mosque around the Kaaba, the first Masjid al-Haram after the birth of Islam. Thirdly, in a magnanimous manner, Muhammad pardoned all those who had taken up arms against him. With the destruction of the idols and the construction of the Masjid al-Haram, a new era was ushered in, facilitating the rise of Islam.

Indian religions

Hinduism

The garbhagriha or inner shrine of a Hindu temple contains an image of the deity.  This may take the form of an elaborate statue, but a symbolic lingam is also very common, and sometimes a yoni or other symbolic form.  Normally only the priests are allowed to enter the chamber, but Hindu temple architecture typically allows the image to be seen by worshippers in the mandapa connected to it (entry to this, and the whole temple, may also be restricted in various ways).

Hinduism allows for many forms of worship and therefore it neither prescribes nor proscribes worship of images (murti). In Hinduism, murti usually means an image that expresses a Divine Spirit (murta). Meaning literally "embodiment", a murti is a representation of a divinity, made usually of stone, wood, or metal, which serves as a means through which a divinity may be worshiped. Hindus consider a murti worthy of serving as a focus of divine worship only after the divine is invoked in it for the purpose of offering worship. The depiction of the divinity must reflect the gestures and proportions outlined in religious tradition.

Jainism

In Jainism, the Tirthankaras ("ford-maker") represent the true goal of all human beings. Their qualities are worshipped by the Jains. Images depicting any of the twenty four Tirthankaras are placed in the Jain temples. There is no belief that the image itself is other than a representation of the being it represents. The Tirthankaras cannot respond to such veneration, but that it can function as a meditative aid. Although most veneration takes the form of prayers, hymns and recitations, the idol is sometimes ritually bathed, and often has offerings made to it; there are eight kinds of offering representing the eight types of karmas as per Jainism. This form of reverence is not a central tenet of the faith.

Buddhism

Very early Buddhism avoided representions of the Buddha, who was represented by symbols or an empty space. Later large images of the Historical Buddha, and other buddhas and bodhisattvas became important in many schools of Buddhist art, and have mostly remained so.  The attitude of the devotee towards the image is highly complicated and variable in Buddhism, depending on the particular tradition, and the degree of training in Buddhist thought of the individual.

The dharma wheel is an image that used for worship in Buddhism. The Dharma represents and symbolizes all of the teachings of the Buddha. The Dharma is a wheel or circle, that maintains different qualities that are meant to be essential to the Buddhist religion. Typically, the wheel shows the eight step path that Buddhists follow to reach Nirvana. The symbol is a wheel in order to show the flow of life: Buddhists believe in reincarnation, so life moves in a cicrcle and does not end in death.

East Asian religions

Shinto

In Shinto, cult images are called shintai. The earliest historical examples of these were natural objects such as stones, waterfalls, trees or mountains, like Mount Fuji, while the vast majority are man-made objects such as swords, jewels or mirrors. Rather than being representative of or part of the kami, shintai are seen as repositories in which the essence of such spirits can temporarily reside to make themselves accessible for humans to worship. A ceremony called kanjō can be used to propagate the essence of a kami into another shintai, allowing the same deity to be enshrined in multiple shrines.

Gallery

See also
 Andachtsbilder
 Antinous Mondragone 
 Asherah
 Cult (religion)
 Devotional medal
 Fetishism
 Holy card
 Honzon
 Madonna and Child
 Prana pratishta
 Puja

Notes

Further reading

 
Religious art
Religious objects
Worship